The Intel Foundation Achievement Awards are US$5,000 scholarships presented to high school students in recognition of their achievements in the scientific disciplines. Up to 15 are awarded, on selection by a panel of judges, each year at the Intel International Science and Engineering Fair (ISEF).

External links 
 Intel ISEF
 About the ISEF awards
 ISEF Press Release, 2005

Scholarships in the United States
Achievement Award